The Priest's Children is a 2013 Croatian comedy film directed by Vinko Brešan.

Plot 
Don Fabijan (Krešimir Mikić) is a young priest who comes to serve on an unnamed small island in the Adriatic.
In order to help increase birth rate on the island, he decides to pierce condoms before they are sold. He therefore teams up with the newsagent Petar (Nikša Butijer) and the pharmacist Marin (Dražen Kühn).

After they abolish all forms of birth control on the entire island, the consequences become more and more complicated.

Cast 
 Krešimir Mikić as Don Fabijan
 Nikša Butijer as Petar
 Marija Škaričić as Marija
 Dražen Kühn as Marin
 Jadranka Đokić as Ana
 Goran Bogdan as Jure
 Stjepan Perić as Police officer Vlado
 Ivan Brkić as Luka
 Marinko Prga as Teacher Vinko
 Stojan Matavulj as Mayor

Release and reception
The film was seen by 33,759 viewers during its opening weekend, which is the best opening of a Croatian film since the country's independence in 1991.

References

External links 

2013 comedy films
2013 films
Croatian comedy films
Films set on islands
Films set in the Mediterranean Sea